Dame Phyllis Irene Frost  ( Turner; 14 September 191730 October 2004) was an Australian welfare worker and philanthropist, known for her commitment to causes, such as helping prisoners. She chaired the Victorian Women's Prisons Council for many years, established the Keep Australia Beautiful movement, worked for Freedom from Hunger and raised millions of dollars for charity.

Career
Phyllis Irene Turner was born in 1917 in Brighton, Melbourne. She attended Presbyterian Ladies' College, Melbourne and the University of Melbourne, training in physiotherapy and, later, criminology. The latter would help her to better understand the female offenders, to whom she had committed her assistance.

At university she met Glenn Frost, whom she was to marry in 1941; the couple had three daughters.

Honours
Phyllis Frost was appointed a Commander of the Order of the British Empire (CBE) in the 1963 Queen's Birthday Honours.

She was appointed a Dame Commander of the order (DBE) in the 1974 New Year's Honours, for "outstanding service to the community".

In the 1992 Australia Day Honours, Dame Phyllis was named a Companion of the Order of Australia (AC).

On 1 January 2001, she was awarded the Centenary Medal, "for long and dedicated voluntary service to welfare at local, state and national levels".

Legacy
The Victorian government recognised her achievements with women prisoners by renaming the Deer Park Metropolitan Women's Correctional Centre the Dame Phyllis Frost Centre in 2000.

Death
Frost died at aged 87 in Nunawading, Melbourne, Victoria, Australia on 30 October 2004 and was given a State Funeral.

The Victorian premier at the time, Steve Bracks paid tribute to Dame Phyllis, acknowledging her work with around 47 charitable committees and associations. He said that "This work marks her as truly one of the great women this state has produced.''

References

External links
Profile in The Age

1917 births
2004 deaths
Australian women philanthropists
Australian philanthropists
Australian Dames Commander of the Order of the British Empire
Companions of the Order of Australia
Recipients of the Australian Sports Medal
Australian justices of the peace
People educated at the Presbyterian Ladies' College, Melbourne
People from Brighton, Victoria
Recipients of the Centenary Medal
University of Melbourne alumni
20th-century philanthropists
20th-century women philanthropists